Saul Farah (born Saul Becerra Gil on January 12, 1983) is a Bolivian professional boxer. He is the Bolivian national Heavyweight boxing champion, having won the title by knocking out 1-0 Romualdo Rivera in the first round on March 13, 2010. He has defended the national title 15 times successfully. His nickname is "El Fenix Asesino" ("The Assassin Phoenix").

Farah was also Bolivian national Cruiserweight champion, title that he obtained September 2, 2008 with a third-round knockout of local, 3 win 9 losses journeyman Fernando Marcelo Vega at San Julian, Santa Cruz de la Sierra, the interim World Boxing Council Latino Heavyweight champion by beating 23-13-2 Esteban Hillman Tababary by twelve round unanimous decision on September 9, 2015, and the interim South American Heavyweight champion, championship which he won by defeating 13 win, 6 defeats and 2 ties (draws) prospect Guido Santana in the third round of their December 21, 2013 fight at Farah's hometown of Santa Ana del Yacuma. Farah is also the Santa Ana del Yacuma city, Beni Department and Santa Cruz de la Sierra Department Heavyweight champion, and he has once fought for world Heavyweight champion honors, albeit for an organization without much international recognition, the World Boxing Union. He lost that bout to Brazilian boxer Marcelo Ferreira dos Santos by third-round knockout on December 15, 2014, at Bahia, Brazil. Farah has also fought for World Boxing Association, World Boxing Organization and International Boxing Federation regional titles without success.

After a bout with Cesar Mamani, set for May 10, 2019,(a second-round technical knockout win) Farah traveled to the Philippines, where he fought American Ronald Johnson, 15–1 with 6 knockout wins, on June 15, 2019,  in what would have been a bout for the Global Boxing Organization's Heavyweight world title, a title without much recognition by the general boxing world and fans alike. The GBO ultimately withdrew recognition of the fight as being for their championship, but Farrah and Johnson still boxed each other, with the American knocking the Bolivian down in the first round and prevailing by 12 rounds unanimous decision. Eventually, Farrah got his 70th career win five weeks later, when he defeated 1 win, 2 losses Luis Gregorio Castedo Yapovenda by second-round knockout on July 20 of that year, back home in Santa Ana del Yacuma, Bolivia.

On November 2, 2019, Farah traveled to the Democratic Republic of Congo to challenge Sadiki "The Buffalo" Maroy (15-2-1) for the vacant UBO Intercontinental Heavyweight title. After a spirited start, Maroy forced a TKO-7 stoppage of Farah earning the UBO title 

On December 21, 2019, Farrah fought his 99th professional boxing match, being stopped in the first round by Christian Hammer in Germany.

Farah was scheduled to defend his Bolivian title in both March and April 2020; however, the COVID-19 pandemic forced postponements of both dates. Then, on October 30 of 2020, Farah defended his title versus Marco Kenny aka La Mole Viscarra over 12 rounds live on Pay Per View (PPV) at the Santa Rosita Coliseum in Santa Cruz, Bolivia. Farah controlled the pace for the majority of the bout but was unlucky in losing a 12-round decision – and relinquishing this title to Kenny

On December 22, 2020, Farah became the world's first fighter to hold a Bridgerweight title, defeating Rosendo 'La Furia' Mercado Eguez from Santa Cruz. Bolivia via 12-round decision 

Farah then defended his Bridgerweight title for the first time on April 3 in Santa Cruz de La Sierra, Bolivia. Farah earned a TKO-1 victory over Ruben Vargas Diaz 

Farah intended to defend his Bridgerweight title of Bolivia for the second time on March 26, 2021; however, Farah's bout versus Pedro 'El Terrible' Guanichaba was not approved by the Bolivian commission in appropriate time. The bout was rescheduled to April 30, 2021, and again to May 21.

Farah and Pedro Tabares would finally meet on June 19 and the entire world would witness an assault in the ring on Farah's life. In the 6th round of their match in Tabares' home town of Pando, Tabares hit Farah with a heavy shot and then threw the champion to the canvas. Once Farah was on the canvas, Tabares jumped on Farah and begin to punch him while he was down as well as deliver three kicks to Farah's head and neck. Farah was awarded the victory by disqualification and while Tabares apologized later for his actions he was not suspended by the Bolivian commission and a rematch was ordered for August 21.

In the 12 round rematch on August 21 again in Pando, Bolivia, Farah would get his revenge. In what was a mostly slow first half of the bout, Farah began to come on in the championship rounds. In the 12th and final round, Farah would storm Tabares in the corner and let his hands go, landing a hard left to the right side of Tabares' head and ear. This concussive location would put Tabares down and upon the restart Farah landed some massive shots that caused the referee to jump in and call a halt to the action. Farah takes a TKO-12 victory and the interim Bolivian heavyweight title.

After the fight, Tabares would claim he was hit with an illegal blow and asked the Bolivian commission to take action and overturn the result and suspend Farah.

Notably, Farah is also a boxing promoter, referee and matchmaker. The majority of his record can be found on Boxrec.com although some are missing as Boxrec does not recognize the Bolivian commission as valid.

References

External links
 

1983 births
Living people
Bolivian male boxers
Heavyweight boxers